Cómplices Al Rescate (English title: Accomplices to the Rescue) is a Mexican children's-teen telenovela produced by Rosy Ocampo for Televisa. It premiered on January 7, 2002, and ended on July 12, 2002.

Belinda starred as child protagonist, playing the twins Silvana and Mariana, being replaced by Daniela Luján, in chapter 92. Laura Flores and Francisco Gattorno play the adult protagonists of the plot, while Cecilia Gabriela and Raúl Magaña starred as adult antagonists. Grisel Margarita and Mickey Santana starred as child antagonists.

Plot 
Mariana Cantú and Silvana Del Valle are twin sisters who are separated on the day of their birth. Mariana stayed with her biological mother, a modest seamstress named Rocio Cantu, her grandmother Doña Pura and her aunt Helena who, despite having all the difficulties, are very united and happy. Mariana is a noble, sweet, cheerful and much loved girl throughout the village. Meanwhile, Silvana is stolen by Regina to pose as her own daughter with her husband Rolando, who Silvana grows up believing is her biological father, as she cannot have children herself in order to keep him and his money at her side. Orlando loves his daughter deeply despite Silvana's strong temperament. She is also superficial and cold.

After 12 years, the twins meet again, and they see the uncanny resemblance between them. Silvana asks Mariana to switch places with her for a day so that she can audition as Silvana and get a part in a famous upcoming children's band called "Cómplices al Rescate", as Mariana can sing well and Silvana cannot sing at all. A while later, Silvana's "father" Rolando's heart illness becomes worse and he eventually suffers a stroke, which leaves him in the hospital. Regina, thinking Rolando has left all his money to her in his will, sees this as an opportunity to kill Rolando and have what she's always wanted, his fortune. Regina tells a weak Rolando that Silvana is not his biological daughter and that she has only been with him for his money the entire marriage. This angers Rolando, who then tries to get up and hurt Regina but ends up suffering another heart attack and dies on the scene.

Regina is then informed that Rolando had changed his will at the last minute, seeing as how she was always cold and never a real mother to Silvana, and left all the money to Silvana, leaving her nanny, Macrina and her godfather, Raul, in charge of the fortune until Silvana turns eighteen. This infuriates Regina, who then realizes that the twins have met and uses this as an opportunity to get the inheritance back under her name and remain rich. Regina and Gerardo then decide to kidnap Mariana too and force her to pose as Silvana, seeing as how she is actually able to sing, with the intention of making a fortune off of the Complices band and eventually, get back the inheritance. Macrina is now in charge of Mariana, and sees how Mariana is becoming friends with the Complices. She tells Mariana that perhaps the Complices will be able to help. Mariana opens up to Joaquin, Julia, Felipe and Andres, who agree to help return both twins to their mother.

Throughout the series they meet people like Joaquin and his siblings. Joaquin is an orphan along with his sister Julia and his brother Felipe. Their parents died in a car accident and the kids were left in the care of his aunt Florencia, who later gets tired of them and abandons them. With the help of their friend and neighbor Andres (who is secretly in love with Julia) and his parents, these kids can keep living alone in the home. This becomes their biggest secret, one they must keep at all costs from the world, especially their neighbor Doña Meche, who becomes obsessed with proving that the children live alone.

The twins are returned to Rocio, who is shocked to find out she truly did have twins as she suspected throughout her entire pregnancy. But being from a small, humble town, she was unable to get any sort of ultrasound done. Shortly after, Alberto asks Rocio to marry him. She accepts and the two wed. When the truth about what Regina and Gerardo did comes to light, Gerardo flees and Regina fakes her own death. Rocio and her family move into Silvana's adopted father mansion, which she had unknowingly inherited after his death.

This is where the second half of the story commences. While Silvana was posing as Mariana, she realized that Rocio really wasn't aware that she had twins and did not give her up shortly after her birth. This helps Silvana unlock her singing voice and allows her to sing as beautifully as Mariana. The two twins now begin singing together as the lead vocalists of the Complices. Regina comes back at this point under the alias Tania Belmont to take her revenge on Silvana. This becomes the main focus of the second half of the telenovela.

"Tania" opens up a new record label, Enter Records with the intent of starting a new band to destroy the Complices and get Silvana on her label so that she can gain her trust and get back Rolando's fortune. Tania offers Silvana a recording contract as the one and only vocalist of a new band she calls Silvana y los Bandidos (Silvana and the Bandits). Silvana accepts, leaving Mariana heartbroken and the other Complices hurting.

Cast

Main 
Laura Flores as Rocío Cantú
Francisco Gattorno as Alberto del Río
Belinda as Mariana Cantú and Silvana del Valle Ontiveros 
Daniela Luján as Mariana Cantú and Silvana del Valle Ontiveros 
Norma Herrera as Doña Pura
Johnny Lozada as Sebastián
Gustavo Rojo as Dr. Federico Rueda
Cecilia Gabriela as Regina Ontiveros Vda. del Valle/Tania Velmont
Silvia Lomelí as Helena Cantú
Maribel Fernández as Macrina Bautista
Raúl Magaña as Gerardo Ontiveros
Miguel Pizarro as Vicente Rosales
Ramiro Torres as Ramón
Alejandro Speitzer as Felipe Olmos
Mickey Santana as Omar Contreras
Grisel Margarita as Priscila Ricco Ontiveros
Martha Sabrina as Julia Olmos
Geraldine Galván as Doris Torres
Vadhir Derbez as Andrés Rosales
Isaac Castro as Mateo Torres
Ana Valeria as Dulce Rosales
Fabián Chávez as Joaquín Olmos
Rafael del Villar as Dr. Raúl Olivo
Rossana San Juan as Lorna Rico
Adriana Chapela as Alicia
Arlette Pacheco as Florencia
Gerardo Albarrán as Arturo Vargas
Carlos Bonavides as Ofelio
Martín Ricca as Martín
Naydelin Navarrete as Naydelin Mendoza
Roberto Marín as Roberto Obregón
Olivia Bucio as Marcela
Raúl Buenfil as Jaime Obregón
Francisco Avendaño as Héctor
Adriana Laffan as Lourdes "Lulu" Mendoza
Patricia Martínez as María Contreras
Héctor Parra as Santiago Salas
Eugenio Derbez as Mantequilla's voice

Recurring 
Pedro Weber "Chatanuga" as Don Giuseppe
Aida Pierce as Biba Solasi
Paco Ibáñez as Fortunato Ricco
Irina Areu as María Eugenia "Maru"
Roberto "Puck" Miranda as Damián
Verónica Macías as Clarita 
Yolanda Ventura as Clarita 
Orlando Miguel as Pepe 
Uberto Bondoni as Pepe 
Miguel Priego as Father Arango
Joana Brito as Doña Meche
Miguel Ángel Fuentes as El Sombras
Mariana Sánchez as Mrs. Yoli
Leonardo Trevole as El Trampas
Gerardo Albarrán as Arturo Vargas
Esteban Franco as Herminio
Benjamín Islas as El Navajas
Ana Silvia Contreras as Lolita
Sergio Acosta as Joel Contreras
Mónica Dossetti as Sonia
Óscar Traven as Sr. Torres
Alejandro Aragón as Luis Torres
Ricardo Vera as Comandante Malpica
Arturo Vázquez as Antonio
Agustín Arana as Rodolfo García
Gerardo Gallardo as Tijerino
Dalilah Polanco as Nina Kuti Kuti

Guest stars 
Manuel Saval as Rolando del Valle
Polly as Maestra Glafira
Jacqueline Bracamontes as Jocelyn

Awards

Soundtracks 
 Cómplices Al Rescate: Silvana
 Cómplices Al Rescate: Mariana
 Cómplices Al Rescate: El Gran Final
 Canta con Cómplices Al Rescate

References

External links 

2002 telenovelas
Mexican telenovelas
2002 Mexican television series debuts
2002 Mexican television series endings
Spanish-language telenovelas
Television shows set in Mexico
Televisa telenovelas
Children's telenovelas
Teen telenovelas
Television series about children